Jörg Ziegler (born 16 March 1927) was a Swiss equestrian. He competed in two events at the 1952 Summer Olympics.

References

External links

1927 births
Possibly living people
Swiss male equestrians
Olympic equestrians of Switzerland
Equestrians at the 1952 Summer Olympics
Place of birth missing (living people)